The Sonata for Violin and Cello is a composition written by Maurice Ravel from 1920 to 1922. He dedicated it to Claude Debussy, who had died in 1918. It premiered on 6 April 1922 with Hélène Jourdan-Morhange playing the violin and Maurice Maréchal the cello. It is in the key of A minor, with the fourth movement in the relative major key of C. It is M. 73 in the catalogue compiled by Marcel Marnat.

Structure
The work consists of four movements:

References

External links
 
 
 
 

Compositions by Maurice Ravel
1922 compositions
Ravel
Ravel
Music with dedications